Khachik (also Romanized as Khāchīk and Khachīk) is a village in Sahandabad Rural District, Tekmeh Dash District, Bostanabad County, East Azerbaijan Province, Iran. At the 2006 census, its population was 139, in 26 families.

References 

Populated places in Bostanabad County